The Ferrari F2005 is a Formula One racing car used by Ferrari for the 2005 Formula One World Championship. The chassis was designed by Rory Byrne, Ignazio Lunetta, Aldo Costa, Marco Fainello, John Iley and Marco de Luca with Ross Brawn playing a vital role in leading the production of the car as the team's Technical Director and Paolo Martinelli assisted by Giles Simon leading the engine design and operations. The car was driven by Michael Schumacher and Rubens Barrichello. This is the last Ferrari F1 car to feature a V10 engine.

Overview
After 6 straight seasons of Ferrari winning the Constructors' Championship, and five straight Drivers' Championships, the F2005 was not nearly as successful a car as its predecessors, notching only a single victory, subsequently Ferrari scored their lowest result in the constructors since 1995. The main reason for Ferrari's lack of form was down to the Bridgestone tyres the team used, which were poor in comparison to the Michelin tyres that were used by the majority of teams that were competing against Ferrari (Renault, McLaren, Toyota, Williams, BAR, Red Bull Racing and Sauber all had Michelin) in respect to a new rule for the 2005 season dictating that races had to be completed without tyre changes.

At the car's launch, Ross Brawn stated that the F2005 was an evolution of previous cars and design ideas simply adapted to the new regulations for the season. Minor changes had been made over the previous car to improve airflow and conserve the tyres as much as possible. Originally intended to debut in Spain, the F2005 was pressed into service earlier in Bahrain, once it became clear that Renault and McLaren had superior cars and better pace.

Another reason for the car's uncompetitiveness was aero changes that were done to the cars for that year, which encouraged the teams to generate more downforce from the central part of the diffuser and Ferrari's engine and gearbox design prevented them from opening up the diffuser as much as they would have liked.

The car is also notable for appearing during the opening ceremony of the 2006 Winter Olympics, driven by Luca Badoer. During the ceremony, there was a pit stop demo by the Ferrari pit crew, and Badoer performed donuts as well. As a result, this made the car the only Formula One car to appear during an Olympic opening or closing ceremony.

Season review
The F2005 was unreliable in its debut event. Although Michael Schumacher qualified on the front row, he retired with hydraulic failure just a few laps into the race; Barrichello only managed four timed laps over the whole weekend before the race (including his two qualifying runs), but did finish in 9th position.

The best result achieved all season was a one-two finish at the United States Grand Prix, where, due to Michelin claiming that their tyres were unsafe, only six cars competed (Ferrari, Jordan and Minardi all raced on Bridgestone tyres, the tyre they had been using all season). This was to be Ferrari's and Michael Schumacher's only race win of the season. The tyres were seen as the overriding reason why the car was off the pace all season.

Ross Brawn admitted the car had aerodynamic problems and the gearbox was quite bulky compared to previous designs, but refused to blame Aldo Costa for the shortcomings.

The most competitive races for Ferrari where all twenty cars competed were at the San Marino and Hungarian Grands Prix. At Imola, Michael Schumacher qualified thirteenth after making a mistake in the second qualifying session the day before, but on race day Bridgestone were at their most competitive, with Michael storming through the field to challenge eventual race winner Fernando Alonso, putting a huge amount of pressure on the 2005 World Champion, but being unable to find a way past. As for the Hungarian Grand Prix, Michael Schumacher qualified on pole, almost a second ahead of second placed Juan Pablo Montoya (McLaren-Mercedes) and led the race on a track where the Michelin tyre was expected to hold an advantage over their Japanese rivals. Michael had a light fuel load, and was eventually beaten by McLaren driver Kimi Räikkönen, who at the end of the day had a better pit stop strategy.
Apart from those two races, Ferrari often never looked in contention for race victories, and eventually finished a distant third in the Constructors' Championship, with Michael Schumacher and Rubens Barrichello suffering their worst championship positions in recent memory with Schumacher scoring 62 points, and Barrichello only 38 points. Barrichello left for the Honda team by the end of the season, and was replaced by fellow Brazilian Felipe Massa for the 2006 season.

Ferrari used 'Marlboro' logos, except at the Canadian, United States, French, British, Turkish, Italian and Belgian Grands Prix.

Complete Formula One results
(key) (results in bold indicate pole position; results in italics indicate fastest lap)

* 90 of the 100 points were scored with the F2005

References

F2005
2005 Formula One season cars